Themis Kefalas (born 28 May 2000) is a Greek professional footballer who plays as a defender for Super League 2 club Episkopi.

Career

At the age of 16, Kefalas joined the youth academy of English eighth tier side Haringey Borough. In 2018, he signed for QPR in the English second tier. In 2019, he was sent on loan to English sixth tier club Billericay Town. Before the second half of 2020–21, Kefalas was sent on loan to Barnet in the English fifth tier. 

Before the second half of 2021–22, he signed for Greek team Panserraikos after receiving interest from France and Spain. On 2 February 2022, he debuted for Panserraikos during a 0–1 loss to Anagennisi Karditsa.

References

External links
 

2000 births
Association football defenders
Barnet F.C. players
Billericay Town F.C. players
Expatriate footballers in England
Greek expatriate footballers
Greek expatriate sportspeople in England
Living people
National League (English football) players
Panserraikos F.C. players
Queens Park Rangers F.C. players
Footballers from Athens
Greek footballers
Super League Greece 2 players